Irene Eber ( 1929 in Halle – April 2019; née Geminder) was an Israeli Orientalist. She was the Louis Frieberg Professor of East Asian Studies (emeritus) at the Hebrew University of Jerusalem at Jerusalem (Sinologist), and Senior Fellow of the Harry S. Truman Research Institute. She lived in Jerusalem. She was also a specialist in translations from Chinese.

Works 
 Chinese and Jews: Encounters Between Cultures.  Vallentine Mitchell & Co Ltd. 2007
 Chinese Tales.  Introd. By Martin Buber, Transl. Alex Page. Humanity Books. 1998. 
 The Jewish Bishop and the Chinese Bible: S.I.J. Schereschewsky (1831–1906). Brill Academic Pub. 1999. 304 p. 
 Bible in Modern China. The Literary and Intellectual Impact. Steyler Verlagsbuchhandlung, 1999. With Nicolas Standaert, Arnulf Camps, and Jost Zetzsche.
 Confucianism, the Dynamics of Tradition.  Macmillan Library Reference. 1986
 Influence, Translation and Parallels. Selected Studies on the Bible in China. With Marián Gálik. Steyler Verlagsbuchhandlung. 330 Seiten. 
 The Choice - Poland, 1939-1945. 2004. Schocken Books Inc., New York. Penguin Putnam Inc.,US. 240 p.  (A Holocaust survivor's story describes her experiences in wartime Mielec. Eber's book is a psychological analysis of coping with the destructive forces that engulfed her young life at Halle, Mielec, Brünnlitz (Brněnec), Kraków, Prague, Regensburg, Cham, Munich, Frankfurt am Main and Zeilsheim.)
 Above the Drowning Sea, documentary on the Shanghai Jews, featured witness. 2017

References 

1929 births
2019 deaths
Academic staff of the Hebrew University of Jerusalem
Israeli sinologists
Israeli people of German-Jewish descent
People from Halle (Saale)
People from the Province of Saxony